611 Valeria is a minor planet orbiting the Sun that was discovered by American astronomer Joel Hastings Metcalf on September 24, 1906, from Taunton, Massachusetts. The name may have been inspired by the asteroid's provisional designation 1906 VL.

Photometric observations of this asteroid at the Organ Mesa Observatory in Las Cruces, New Mexico, during 2012 gave a light curve with a period of 6.977 ± 0.001 hours and a brightness variation of 0.08 ± 0.01 in magnitude. This result is consistent with a previous study from 2008.

References

External links
 Lightcurve plot of (611) Valeria, Antelope Hills Observatory
 
 

Background asteroids
Valeria
Valeria
S-type asteroids (Tholen)
L-type asteroids (SMASS)
19060924